Jean Alexandre (born 15 June 1917, date of death unknown) was a Belgian cyclist. He competed in the team pursuit event at the 1936 Summer Olympics.

References

External links
 

1917 births
Year of death missing
Belgian male cyclists
Olympic cyclists of Belgium
Cyclists at the 1936 Summer Olympics
Place of birth missing